Ahmad Abdulal (January 22, 1932 – November 11, 2013) was the first broadcast journalist in Kuwait.  He first studied law, but later decided on a television career.

References

External links

Al Watan TV

2013 deaths
1932 births
Television journalists